Gefyra (literally meaning "Bridge", until 1926 Τοψίν/Topsin, /Topchievo) is a village and a community of the Chalkidona municipality, about 20 km northwest from Thessaloniki.

Before the 2011 local government reform it was part of the municipality of Agios Athanasios, of which it was a municipal district. The 2011 census recorded 3,059 inhabitants in the community. The community of Gefyra covers an area of 29.836 km2.

There is a highway junction near Gefyra, where the European route E75 and E86 meets.

History
The village is the site of the surrender of the Ottoman garrison of Thessaloniki under Hasan Tahsin Pasha to the Greek army under Crown Prince Constantine during the First Balkan War (1912). The villa where the surrender took place now houses the Balkan Wars Museum.

See also
 List of settlements in the Thessaloniki regional unit

References

Populated places in Thessaloniki (regional unit)